Herman DeVerne Young (March 21, 1906 – June 16, 1985) was an American football player. He played college football for the University of Detroit and in the National Football League (NFL) as an end for the Providence Steam Roller during the 1930 season. He appeared in three NFL games.

References

1906 births
1985 deaths
Detroit Titans football players
Providence Steam Roller players
Players of American football from Michigan